Chase Library is the public library of West Harwich, Massachusetts.  It is located in a small architecturally distinguished Colonial Revival building constructed in 1911.  Efforts to build a library in West Harwich began in 1901, and reached fruition in 1906, with the gift of the home of Caleb Chase, a Harwich native who was son of a major local shipowner and shipbuilder and a successful businessman in his own right.  The house, however, was not suitable for housing a library, so Dr. John Nickerson donated a corner of his large property that was near Chase's house for the purpose, and the present building, a small three-bay wood frame hip-roof building was constructed there.

The library building was listed on the National Register of Historic Places in 2014.

See also
National Register of Historic Places listings in Harwich, Massachusetts

References

External links
Chase Free Library web site

1911 establishments in Massachusetts
Harwich, Massachusetts
Libraries established in 1911
Libraries in Barnstable County, Massachusetts
Libraries on the National Register of Historic Places in Massachusetts
National Register of Historic Places in Barnstable County, Massachusetts